Patricia Maria Vizitiu (born 15 October 1988) is a Romanian female handballer for ASC Corona 2010 Brașov (women's handball) and the Romanian national team.

Her father Dumitru Vizitiu was a footballer in the 1980s. Her older brother Dacian is also a footballer.

International honours
EHF Champions League:
Silver Medalist: 2010
Bronze Medalist: 2009, 2012
EHF Cup:
Gold Medalist: 2018
EHF Challenge Cup:
Gold Medalist: 2007
EHF Cup Winners' Cup:
Silver Medalist: 2008

References

External links

1988 births
Living people
People from Petroșani
Romanian female handball players
SCM Râmnicu Vâlcea (handball) players
Üsküdar Belediyespor players
Romanian expatriate sportspeople in Turkey
Romanian expatriate sportspeople in Slovenia
Expatriate handball players in Turkey
Handball players at the 2016 Summer Olympics
Olympic handball players of Romania